Gougerot–Blum syndrome  is a variant of pigmented purpuric dermatitis, a skin condition characterized by minute, rust-colored to violaceous, lichenoid papules that tend to fuse into plaques of various hues.  Relative to other variants, it is characterized clinically by a male predominance, pruritus, with a predilection for the legs, and histologically, it features a densely cellular lichenoid infiltrate.

It was characterized in 1925.

Gougerot–Blum syndrome is named after the French dermatologists Henri Gougerot (1881–1955) and Paul Blum (1878–1933).

See also 
 Pigmentary purpuric eruptions
 Skin lesion
 List of cutaneous conditions

References

External links 

Vascular-related cutaneous conditions
Syndromes
Diseases named for discoverer